= Nannatukavu =

Village in Thiruvananthapuram District, Kerala, India

Nannatukavu is a small remote Village located in the panchayat of Vembayam, in Nedumangad block, Thiruvananthapuram district, Kerala, India.

== Geography ==
Nannatukavu is on the Highway connecting Pothencode Town with Kanyakulangara. Nannatukavu is situated almost 16 km from Thiruvananthapuram City, 1.5 km from Pothencode Town and 3 km from Kanyakulangara. Nannatukavu is well accessible from all major roadways, like connected to the Pothencode Bypass, thereby linking Kazhakuttom, Kaniyapuram, Mangalapuram, Venjaramoodu, Vembayam, and even have a short cut access to Sreekaryam, which is situated on the periphery of the Thiruvananthapuram City.

== Culture ==
Nannatukavu has a large Masjid, Pulimaath Temple and its greenery. Nannatukavu has a Govt. Upper Primary School,

== Economics ==
The main crops grown in and around Nannatukavu are rubber, coconut, tapioca, pepper, chilies, ginger, and tomato. In earlier times, Nannatukavu was known for its rice harvest, paddy fields, mangoes and Jackfruits, but these are no longer cultivated here other than in negligible quantities. The village also has Brick block manufacturers, Plantations, Rubber Nursery and Honey Traders.
